Jacqueline Swick (born 31 May 2002) is an Australian representative sweep-oar rower. She has represented at senior World Championships and won medals at World Rowing Cups and U23 World Championships.

Club and state rowing
Swick is a Western Australian and attended Presbyterian Ladies' College, Perth where she took up rowing. Her senior club rowing has been from the Swan River Rowing Club in Perth. 

Price first made state selection for Western Australia in the 2022 women's senior eight which contested the Queen's Cup at the Interstate Regatta within the Australian Rowing Championships.  Racing in Swan River colours she won the Australian championship title in the U23 coxless four at the 2022 Australian Rowing Championships.

International representative rowing
In March 2022 Swick was selected in the Australian training squad to prepare for the 2022 international season and the 2022 World Rowing Championships.  She rowed in the four seat of the Australian women's eight at World Rowing Cups II and III taking bronze in Poznan and winning gold in Lucerne.   She was then selected in Australia's U23 coxless four to row at the U23 World Rowing Championships in Varese. In that crew with Genevieve Hart, Paige Barr and Eliza Gaffney she won a bronze medal.   

At the 2022 World Rowing Championships at Racize, she was back in the Australian women's senior eight. They made the A final and finished in fifth place.

References

External links
Swick at World Rowing

2002 births
Living people
Australian female rowers
People educated at Presbyterian Ladies' College, Perth
21st-century Australian women